Ian Aitken may refer to:

Ian Aitken (journalist) (1927–2018), British journalist and political commentator
Ian Aitken (footballer) (born 1967), former Australian rules footballer